Phraekkasa (also colloquially known as Phraek Sa) is a tambon (sub-district) and neighbourhood in the area of Mueang Samut Prakan district, Samut Prakan province on eastern outskirts Bangkok.

History & toponymy
The area dates back to the late Ayutthaya era, the first people who migrated to settle at Phraekkasa. They are Mon people from Pathum Thani and Pak Lat (now Phra Pradaeng). They set up houses along the Khlong Phraekkasa canal. At that time, the vicinity was still a mangrove forest.

Originally, the area was referred to as Phraek Ta Sa (แพรกตาสา). Later on, it was corrupted into Phraekkasa like today.

Geography
Phraekkasa is the eastern part of Mueang Samut Prakan, the capital district of the province. Its adjacent areas, clockwise from north, are Bang Mueang and Phraekkasa Mai, Bang Pu Mai, and Thai Ban Mai. It all belongs on Mueang Samut Prakan.

Administration
It is under the administration of two local government bodies: Phraekkasa Town Municipality, and Phraekkasa Sub-District Municipality.

It is also divided into seven administrative muban (village)

Economy
Phraekkasa is an industrial zone. There are many industrial estates in the area.

Transportation
The area is served by nearby the Phraek Sa Station (E21) of the BTS skytrain, whose Sukhumvit Line runs above Sukhumvit Road (Highway 3).

It is also crossed by Phraekkasa Road (Rural Route 16-001).

References

Tambon of Samut Prakan Province
Neighbourhoods in Thailand